The Cowboy Way is a live recording released by the Western band Riders in the Sky in 1987 (see 1987 in music). It is available as a single CD. This is the second live album recorded by Riders in the Sky.

Track listing
"Texas Plains" (Stuart Hamblen) – 2:25
"Back in the Saddle Again" (Gene Autry, Ray Whitley) – 1:59
 "(Ghost) Riders in the Sky" (Stan Jones) – 3:06
"Carry Me Back to the Lone Prairie" (Carson J. Robison) – 2:41
"Mr. Sincere (State Fair Burnout)" (Douglas B. Green, Fred LaBour, Paul Chrisman) – 1:21
"Concerto for Violin and Longhorns" (Chrisman) – 2:31
"Lonely Yukon Stars" (Green) – 3:01
"The Salting of the Slug" (LaBour) – 4:30
"When Payday Rolls Around" (Bob Nolan) – 1:38
"My Oklahoma" (Terrye Newkirk) – 2:42
"Reincarnation" (Wallace McRae) – 3:06
"Miss Molly" (Cindy Walker) – 2:44
"Ridin' Down the Canyon (When the Desert Sun Goes Down)" (Gene Autry, Smiley Burnette) – 2:55
"That's How the Yodel Was Born" (Green) – 2:09
"Happy Trails" (Dale Evans) – 1:26

Personnel
Douglas B. Green (a.k.a. Ranger Doug) – guitar, vocals
Paul Chrisman (a.k.a. Woody Paul) – fiddle, vocals
Fred LaBour (a.k.a. Too Slim) – bass, vocals

References

External links
Riders in the Sky Official Website

1987 live albums
Riders in the Sky (band) live albums
albums produced by Emory Gordy Jr.
MCA Records live albums